Elena Savelyeva (born 16 June 1984) is a Russian world champion boxer, and European champion.

Early life 
Elena Savelyeva had a very dynamic life as she became well known in the boxing ring internationally. But Savelyeva was not only a boxer; she also ran track and also learned how to play guitar. She eventually started training for boxing as well using her music talents to make money in order to continue being coached. She made the switch from track to kickboxing, where she was very successful and won awards worldwide, specifically in the kickboxing World Cup in 2007. From kickboxing, she then began her career in boxing.

Family 
Savelyeva's mother was an elementary school teacher and her father an electrical engineer. She has one older brother. She has said that her mother’s hard work taught her the importance of earning what she gets.

Fights 
As an amateur, Savelyeva went 134–15–1, winning the world, European (2X) and Russian (6X) championships. When Savelyeva gained more wins, she became co-promoted by Salita Promotions and Russian-based Alexander Nevskiy Promotion Group. During her fourth professional fight Savelyeva, 3–0, 3 KOs, took the leap to 10 rounds and faced former world title challenger Nevenka Mikulic of Croatia, on February 10 at Qin Shi Huang Restaurant in Saint Petersburg, Russia. Savelyeva, 4-0, 3 KOs, returned to the ring on Friday, July 13, 2018 in Herceg Novi, Montenegro, for an eight-round showdown against current number 10 IBF and number 11 WBC contender, Nina Radovanovic, 12-2, 3 KOs, of Serbia. Savelva also fought in November, 2019, in a 6-round flyweight bout at the Kansas Star Arena in Mulvane Kansas against Tatinia Willams(0-2). The fight lasted 36 seconds before Saveleva claimed the win. In 2012, Savelyeva obtained a 12-9 victory at the olympic games in London, U.K.

She represented Russia in the 2012 Summer Olympics taking place in London in the Flyweight Division. By defeating Kim Hye Song of North Korea in the opening round, Savelyeva won the first ever women's boxing bout at the Olympics. In the Quarter finals, however Elena lost to Ren Cancan of China 7-12.

Women's boxing in Russia 
In Russia, women were looked down at for boxing professionally in the 1900s; because of this, female boxers started to box in the streets, or underground arenas, where they could fight and make money off bets. Women even boxed men in these situations and sometimes men boxers would be aggravated that a woman beat him, and would call the police. Since the 1990s, Russia has made great improvements to the way women's boxing is viewed. They have come so far as to host women's wrestling events. "The city of Ulan-Ude, Russia, is proud to host AIBA Women’s World Boxing Championships 2019.  Starting on October 3rd, the best female boxers in the world will compete in the 11th edition of these championships for the most prestigious boxing titles in the world.” Another plus that came with the social changes in Russia was the ability for women to train openly and safely throughout the country. This allowed women to become great and reach professional levels such as the Olympics. When the announcement was made in 2009 that female pugilists would be included in the next Olympics, it was a chance to redress an age-old imbalance. ”The Olympic tournament has witnessed some fresh and exciting female boxers who have challenged the men''s competition in dynamic and intriguing bouts. And as the final bell rings today on a terrific tournament, the sport of women''s boxing will surely not be stepping out of the ring or the spotlight anytime soon.” It’s no surprise that the world was watching with great anticipation as Russia''s Elena Savelyeva and Hye Song Kim of DPK Korea stepped through the ropes into the boxing ring at the London Olympics. After all, they made history as the first women ever to do so. The pair touched gloves, the bell rang, a punch was thrown—and women's boxing was suddenly a sport everyone was talking about.

Olympic boxing rules 
To be classified as an “elite boxer”, one needs to be between the ages of 10 and 40. Since boxers at the Olympics are “elite”, then the age range for the Olympics is between 19 and 40. The previous age limit was 34. Competition was single elimination. There were three classes of weights for women: flyweight (the lightest), lightweight (the middle), middleweight (the heaviest). To qualify for the 2012 Olympics, fighters had to qualify at the World Championships. For the flyweight division, 12 women qualified. There was only 1 fighters qualified per nation that entered a fighter into the Olympics. Slots are limited as to how many fighters can be in the event. Match-ups are chosen at random. The winner of the final gets the gold, the loser gets the silver, and the bronze goes to both of the losers from the two semifinal fights. Scoring was determined by five judges, each hitting a button when a fighter hit the other with the part of the glove that had a white mark on it. The hit could not be below the belt. For a point to be scored in the system, when 3 of 5 judges said that the fighter made a scoring hit within one second of each other. Most rounds end in a 10-9 score, but if the boxers are a good, even match, then sometimes both fighters receive points.

References

External links
 AIBA London 2012 Profile

1984 births
Russian women boxers
Olympic boxers of Russia
Boxers at the 2012 Summer Olympics
Living people
AIBA Women's World Boxing Championships medalists
Boxers at the 2015 European Games
European Games gold medalists for Russia
European Games medalists in boxing
Bantamweight boxers
Sportspeople from Tula, Russia